Eddie Kirkland (August 16, 1923 – February 27, 2011) was an American electric blues guitarist, harmonicist, singer, and songwriter.

Kirkland, known as the "Gypsy of the Blues" for his rigorous touring schedules, played and toured with John Lee Hooker from 1949 to 1962. After his period of working in tandem with Hooker he pursued a successful solo career, recording for RPM Records, Fortune Records, Volt Records, and King Records, sometimes under the stage name Eddie Kirk. Kirkland continued to tour, write and record albums until his death in February 2011. His last performance, the night before his death, was at Dunedin Brewery, Florida.

Biography
Kirkland was born in Kingston, Jamaica to a mother, aged 11 (Kirkland was raised believing his mother was his sister and he was in his early twenties when the truth was revealed to him by his mother), and first heard the blues from "field hollers", and raised in Dothan, Alabama until 1935, when he stowed away in the Sugar Girls Medicine Show tent truck and left town. Blind Blake was the one who influenced him the most in those early days. He was placed on the chorus line with "Diamond Tooth Mary" McLean. When the show closed a year later, he was in Dunkirk, Indiana where he briefly returned to school.

He joined the United States Army during World War II. It was racism in the military, he said, that led him to seek out the devil. After his discharge Kirkland traveled to Detroit where his mother had relocated. After a day's work at the Ford Rouge Plant, Kirkland played his guitar at house parties, and there he met John Lee Hooker. Kirkland, a frequent second guitarist in recordings from 1949–1962. "It was difficult playin' behind Hooker but I had a good ear and was able to move in behind him on anything he did."

Kirkland fashioned his own style of playing open chords, and transformed the rough, porch style delta blues into the electric age by using his thumb, rather than a guitar pick. He secured his own series of recordings with Sid Nathan of King Records in 1953, at Fortune Records in 1958 and, by 1961, on his own album It's the Blues Man, with the King Curtis Band for Prestige Records.

He wrote and recorded "I Must Have Done Somebody Wrong" for Fortune in 1959. As "Done Somebody Wrong", it was substantially appropriated without credit by Elmore James in 1960, and is most well known for a 1971 interpretation by The Allman Brothers Band. Kirkland remained aggrieved about the matter, saying in 1984, "[I wrote] 'Must Have Done Somebody Wrong,' which Elmore James stole from me and the Allman Brothers performed."

Kirkland became Hooker's road manager and the two traveled from Detroit to the Deep South on many tours, the last being in 1962 when Hooker abandoned Kirkland to go overseas. Kirkland found his way to Macon, Georgia and began performing with Otis Redding as his guitarist and band leader. As Eddie Kirk, he released "The Hawg" as a single on Volt Records in 1963. The record was overshadowed by Rufus Thomas's recordings, and Kirkland, discouraged by the music industry and his own lack of education to change the situation, turned to his other skill and sought work as an auto mechanic to earn a living for his growing family.

In 1970, one of the revivals of the blues was taking place. Peter B. Lowry found Kirkland in Macon and convinced him to record again. His first sessions were done in a motel room, resulting in the acoustic, solo LP Front and Center; his second was a studio-recorded band album, The Devil and Other Blues Demons. Both were released on Lowry's Trix Records label. It was during the mid-1970s that Kirkland befriended the British blues-rock band, Foghat. Kirkland remained with Lowry, Trix, and was based in the Hudson Valley for twelve years. It was during this period that Kirkland appeared on Don Kirshner's Rock Concert with Muddy Waters, Honeyboy Edwards, and Foghat. "Eddie's thumb pick and fingers style give him freedom to play powerful chord riffs rich in rhythms and harmonic tension. He plays like a funky pianist, simultaneously covering bass lines, chord kick, and counterpoint."

In 1973, Kirkland performed at the Ann Arbor Blues and Jazz Festival. John Sinclair decided that they should salute Detroit blues musicians and had them play on the Saturday afternoon; these included Bobo Jenkins, Baby Boy Warren, One String Sam, Little Junior Cannaday, and Boogie Woogie Red.

The 1990s brought Randy Labbe as manager, booking agent and on his own record label, Deluge, who recorded Kirkland. Three albums were produced during this Maine period, which included Gregg Hoover on guitar, James Thacker on bass, and Darren Thiboutot on drums. Darren Thiboutot Jr., son of Darren Thiboutot sat in with the band at The Venue in Portland, Maine. One live, one with a guest appearance from Hooker and one containing a duet with Christine Ohlman. By 2000, Kirkland was on his own again, always doing his own driving to concerts in his Ford Country Squire, crossing the country several times a year. Labeled now as the Road Warrior, "A thickset, powerful man in the waistcoat and pants of a pin strip suit; red shirt, medallion, shades and a black leather cap over a bandanna, his heavy leather overcoat slung over his arm,.... he's already a Road Warrior par excellence."

Kirkland contributed two songs to long'time friends Foghat's album Last Train Home in 2010.

A documentary short entitled Pick Up the Pieces was made about a year in Kirkland's life (2010).

Death
Kirkland's last performance, the night before his death, was at Dunedin Brewery.

He died in a car accident on February 27, 2011, in Crystal River, Florida. At approximately 8:30 a.m. a bus hit Kirkland's car, a 1998 Ford Taurus wagon. Reportedly Kirkland attempted to make a U-turn on U.S. 98 and Oak Park Boulevard, putting him directly in the path of a Greyhound bus. The bus struck the vehicle on the right side and pushed it approximately 200 feet from the point of impact. Kirkland suffered serious injuries and was transported by helicopter to Tampa General Hospital, where he died a short time later. The bus driver and 13 passengers on the bus were not hurt.

Family
Kirkland was survived by his wife, Mary, and nine children. He was predeceased by one child Betty, and his first wife Ida.

Discography

Singles

Albums

With John Lee Hooker
House of the Blues (Chess, 1951–52, [1959])
John Lee Hooker Plays & Sings the Blues (Chess, 1961, [1961])
Don't Turn Me from Your Door (Atco, 1953, [1963])
Folk Blues (Crown, 1951–54, [1962])
Goin' Down Highway 51 (Specialty, 1948–51, [1971])

References

External links
 Official website

1923 births
2011 deaths
People from Dothan, Alabama
American blues guitarists
American male guitarists
Soul-blues musicians
King Records artists
Jamaican guitarists
Road incident deaths in Florida
Guitarists from Alabama
20th-century American guitarists
20th-century American male musicians
Southland Records artists